The Tenney Park – Yahara River Parkway is a path located in Madison, Wisconsin.

Description
The parkway runs parallel with the Yahara River, leading to the park where the river meets Lake Mendota. In 1999, the park and parkway were successfully nominated and listed on the State and the National Register of Historic Places.

References

Parks on the National Register of Historic Places in Wisconsin
National Register of Historic Places in Madison, Wisconsin
Geography of Madison, Wisconsin
Parkways in the United States